Baseball was contested at the 1974 Central American and Caribbean Games in Santo Domingo, the Dominican Republic.

References
 

1974 Central American and Caribbean Games
1974
1974
Central American and Caribbean Games